Alcaracejos is a city located in  Los Pedroches comarca, province of Córdoba, Spain. According to the 2006 census (INE), the city had a population of 1,485.

See also
Los Pedroches

References

External links
Pedroche en la Red
Alcaracejos - Sistema de Información Multiterritorial de Andalucía

Municipalities in the Province of Córdoba (Spain)